94th Brigade may refer to:

 94th Mixed Brigade (Spain)
 94th Infantry Brigade (United Kingdom)

See also

 94th Division (disambiguation)